Jessica Mayne Fletcher (born 6 May 1992) is an English badminton player. The Garforth, Leeds born, has made good achievement in her junior career.

Playing career
When she was 16, she won the girls' doubles event at the 2009 English National Championships in the Under-17s and Under-19s event. She also won the bronze medal at the European Junior Championships in the girls' doubles event. In 2011, she was the runner-up of the Turkiye Open tournament in the mixed doubles event partnered with Chris Coles.

Achievements

European Junior Championships
Girls' Doubles

BWF International Challenge/Series (1 runner-up)
Mixed Doubles

 BWF International Challenge tournament
 BWF International Series tournament

References

External links 
 

1992 births
Living people
People from Garforth
People educated at Garforth Academy
Sportspeople from Leeds
English female badminton players